Robert Swan Mueller III (born August 7, 1944) is an American lawyer who served as the sixth director of the Federal Bureau of Investigation (FBI) from 2001 to 2013.

A graduate of Princeton University and New York University, Mueller served as a Marine Corps officer during the Vietnam War, receiving a Bronze Star for heroism and a Purple Heart. He subsequently attended the University of Virginia School of Law. Mueller is a registered Republican in Washington, D.C., and was appointed and reappointed to Senate-confirmed positions by presidents George H. W. Bush, Bill Clinton, George W. Bush, and Barack Obama.

Mueller has served both in government and private practice. He was an assistant United States attorney, a United States attorney, United States assistant attorney general for the Criminal Division, a homicide prosecutor in Washington, D.C., acting United States deputy attorney general, partner at D.C. law firm WilmerHale and director of the FBI.

On May 17, 2017, Mueller was appointed by Deputy Attorney General Rod Rosenstein as special counsel overseeing an investigation into allegations of Russian interference in the 2016 U.S. presidential election and related matters. He submitted his report to Attorney General William Barr on March 22, 2019. On April 18, the Department of Justice released it. On May 29, he resigned his post and the Office of the Special Counsel was closed.

Early life and education 
Mueller was born on August 7, 1944, at Doctors Hospital in the New York City borough of Manhattan, the first child of Alice C. Truesdale (1920–2007) and Robert Swan Mueller Jr. (1916–2007). He has four younger sisters: Susan, Sandra, Joan, and Patricia. His father was an executive with DuPont who had served as a Navy officer in the Atlantic and Mediterranean theaters during World War II. His father majored in psychology at Princeton University and played varsity lacrosse.

Mueller is of German, English, and Scottish descent. His paternal great-grandfather, Gustave A. Mueller, was a prominent doctor in Pittsburgh, whose own father, August C. E. Müller, had immigrated to the United States in 1855 from the Province of Pomerania in the Kingdom of Prussia (a historical territory whose area included land now part of Poland and the north-eastern edge of Germany). On his mother's side, he is a great-grandson of the railroad executive William Truesdale.

Mueller grew up in Princeton, New Jersey, where he attended Princeton Country Day School (now known as the Princeton Day School). After he completed eighth grade, his family moved to Philadelphia while Mueller himself went on to attend St. Paul's School in Concord, New Hampshire for high school, where he was captain of the soccer, hockey, and lacrosse teams and won the Gordon Medal as the school's top athlete in 1962. A lacrosse teammate and classmate at St. Paul's School was future Massachusetts Senator and Secretary of State John Kerry.

After graduating from St. Paul's, Mueller entered Princeton University, where he continued to play lacrosse, receiving a Bachelor of Arts in politics in 1966 after completing a senior thesis titled "Acceptance of Jurisdiction in the South West Africa Cases." Mueller was a member of University Cottage Club while he was a student at Princeton. Mueller earned a Master of Arts in international relations from New York University in 1967.

In 1968, Mueller joined the United States Marine Corps. After his military service, he enrolled at the University of Virginia School of Law where he served on the Virginia Law Review and graduated in 1973.

United States Marine Corps service 

Mueller has cited the combat death of his Princeton lacrosse teammate David Spencer Hackett in the Vietnam War as an influence on his decision to pursue military service. Of his classmate, Mueller has said, "One of the reasons I went into the Marine Corps was because we lost a very good friend, a Marine in Vietnam, who was a year ahead of me at Princeton. There were a number of us who felt we should follow his example and at least go into the service. And it flows from there." Hackett was a Marine Corps first lieutenant in the infantry and was killed in 1967 in Quảng Trị province by small arms fire.

After waiting a year so a knee injury could heal, Mueller was accepted for officer training in the United States Marine Corps in 1968, attending training at Parris Island, Officer Candidate School, Army Ranger School, and Army jump school. Of these, he said later that he considered Ranger School the most valuable because he felt "more than anything teaches you about how you react with no sleep and nothing to eat."

In the summer of 1968, he was sent to South Vietnam, where he served as a rifle platoon leader as a second lieutenant with Second Platoon, H Company, 2nd Battalion, 4th Marines, 3rd Marine Division. On December 11, 1968, during an engagement in Operation Scotland II, he earned the Bronze Star with "V" device for combat valor for rescuing a wounded Marine under enemy fire during an ambush in which he saw half of his platoon become casualties. In April 1969, he received an enemy gunshot wound in the thigh, recovered, and returned to lead his platoon until June 1969. For his service in and during the Vietnam War, his military decorations and awards include: the Bronze Star Medal with Combat "V", Purple Heart Medal, two Navy and Marine Corps Commendation Medals with Combat "V", Combat Action Ribbon, National Defense Service Medal, Vietnam Service Medal with four service stars, Republic of Vietnam Gallantry Cross, Republic of Vietnam Campaign Medal, and Parachutist Badge.

After recuperating at a field hospital near Da Nang, Mueller became aide-de-camp to 3rd Marine Division's commanding general, then–Major General William K. Jones, where he "significantly contributed to the rapport" Jones had with other officers, according to one report.

Mueller had originally considered making the Marines his career, but he explained later that he found non-combat life in the corps to be unexciting. After returning from South Vietnam, Mueller was briefly stationed at Henderson Hall, before leaving active-duty service in August 1970 at the rank of captain.

Reflecting on his service in the Vietnam War, Mueller said, "I consider myself exceptionally lucky to have made it out of Vietnam. There were many—many—who did not. And perhaps because I did survive Vietnam, I have always felt compelled to contribute." In 2009, he told a writer that despite his other accomplishments, he was still "most proud the Marine Corps deemed me worthy of leading other Marines."

Career

Private practice and Department of Justice 

After receiving his Juris Doctor in 1973 from the University of Virginia School of Law, Mueller worked as a litigator at the firm Pillsbury, Madison and Sutro in San Francisco until 1976. He then served for 12 years in United States Attorney offices. He first worked in the office of the U.S. Attorney for the Northern District of California in San Francisco, where he rose to be chief of the criminal division, and in 1982, he moved to Boston to work in the office of the U.S. Attorney for Massachusetts as an Assistant United States Attorney, where he investigated and prosecuted major financial fraud, terrorism and public corruption cases, as well as narcotics conspiracies and international money launderers.

After serving as a partner at the Boston law firm of Hill and Barlow, Mueller returned to government service. In 1989, he served in the United States Department of Justice as an assistant to Attorney General Dick Thornburgh and as acting deputy attorney general. James Baker, with whom he worked on national security matters, said he had "an appreciation for the Constitution and the rule of law".

In 1990, he became the United States Assistant Attorney General in charge of the United States Department of Justice Criminal Division. During his tenure, he oversaw prosecutions including that of Panamanian leader Manuel Noriega, the Pan Am Flight 103 (Lockerbie bombing) case, and of the Gambino crime family boss John Gotti.

In 1991, he declared the government had been investigating the Bank of Credit and Commerce International (BCCI) since 1986 in more-than-usual media exposure. Also in 1991, he was elected a fellow of the American College of Trial Lawyers.

In 1993, Mueller became a partner at Boston's Hale and Dorr, specializing in white-collar crime litigation. He returned to public service in 1995 as senior litigator in the homicide section of the District of Columbia United States Attorney's Office. In 1998, Mueller was named U.S. Attorney for the Northern District of California and held that position until 2001.

Federal Bureau of Investigation 
President George W. Bush nominated Mueller for the position of FBI director on July 5, 2001. He and two other candidates, Washington lawyer George J. Terwilliger III and veteran Chicago prosecutor and white-collar crime defense lawyer Dan Webb, were up for the job, but Mueller, described at the time as a conservative Republican, was always considered the front-runner. Terwilliger and Webb both pulled out from consideration around mid-June, while confirmation hearings for Mueller before the Senate Judiciary Committee were quickly set for July 30, only three days before his prostate cancer surgery.

The Senate unanimously confirmed Mueller as FBI director on August 2, 2001, voting 98–0 in favor of his appointment. He had previously served as acting deputy attorney general of the United States Department of Justice (DOJ) for several months before officially becoming the FBI director on September 4, 2001, one week before the September 11 attacks on the World Trade Center and the Pentagon.

On February 11, 2003, one month before the U.S.-led invasion of Iraq, Mueller gave testimony to the Senate Select Committee on Intelligence. Mueller informed the American public that "[s]even countries designated as state sponsors of terrorism—Iran, Iraq, Syria, Sudan, Libya, Cuba, and North Korea—remain active in the United States and continue to support terrorist groups that have targeted Americans. As Director Tenet has pointed out, Secretary Powell presented evidence last week that Baghdad has failed to disarm its weapons of mass destruction, willfully attempting to evade and deceive the international community. Our particular concern is that Saddam Hussein may supply terrorists with biological, chemical or radiological material." Highlighting this worry in February 2003, FBI Special Agent Coleen Rowley wrote an open letter to Mueller in which she warned that "the bureau will [not] be able to stem the flood of terrorism that will likely head our way in the wake of an attack on Iraq" and encouraged Mueller to "share [her concerns] with the President and Attorney General."

On March 10, 2004, while United States Attorney General John Ashcroft was at the George Washington University Hospital for gallbladder surgery, James Comey, the then deputy attorney general, received a call from Ashcroft's wife informing him that White House Chief of Staff Andrew Card and White House Counsel Alberto Gonzales were about to visit Ashcroft to convince him to renew a program of warrantless wiretapping under the Terrorist Surveillance Program which the DOJ ruled unconstitutional. Ashcroft refused to sign, as he had previously agreed, but the following day the White House renewed the program anyway. Mueller and Comey then threatened to resign. On March 12, 2004, after private, individual meetings with Mueller and Comey at the White House, the president supported changing the program to satisfy the concerns of Mueller, Ashcroft, and Comey.

He was inducted into the Ranger Hall of Fame in 2004.

As director, Mueller also barred FBI personnel from participating in enhanced interrogations with the CIA. At a dinner, Mueller defended an attorney (Thomas Wilner) who had been attacked for his role in defending Kuwaiti detainees. Mueller stood up, raised his glass, and said, "I toast Tom Wilner. He's doing what an American should." However, the White House pushed back, encouraging more vigorous methods of pursuing and interrogating terror suspects. When Bush confronted Mueller to ask him to round up more terrorists in the U.S., Mueller responded, saying, "If they [suspects] don't commit a crime, it would be difficult to identify and isolate" them. Vice President Dick Cheney objected by saying, "That's just not good enough. We're hearing this too much from the FBI."

In May 2011, President Barack Obama asked Mueller to continue at the helm of the FBI for two additional years beyond his normal 10-year term, which would have expired on September 4, 2011. The Senate approved this request 100–0 on July 27, 2011. On September 4, 2013, Mueller was replaced by James Comey.

In June 2013, Mueller defended NSA surveillance programs in testimony before a House Judiciary Committee hearing. He said that surveillance programs could have "derailed" the September 11 attacks. Congressman John Conyers disagreed: "I am not persuaded that that makes it OK to collect every call." Mueller also testified that the government's surveillance programs complied "in full with U.S. law and with basic rights guaranteed under the Constitution". He said that "We are taking all necessary steps to hold Edward Snowden responsible for these disclosures."

On June 19, 2017, in the case of Arar v. Ashcroft, Mueller, along with Ashcroft and former Immigration and Naturalization Services Commissioner James W. Ziglar and others, was shielded from civil liability by the Supreme Court for post-9/11 detention of Muslims under policies then brought into place.

Return to private sector 

After leaving the FBI in 2013, Mueller served a one-year term as consulting professor and the Arthur and Frank Payne distinguished lecturer at Stanford University, where he focused on issues related to cybersecurity.

In addition to his speaking and teaching roles, Mueller also joined the law firm WilmerHale as a partner in its Washington office in 2014. Among other roles at the firm, he oversaw the independent investigation into the NFL's conduct surrounding the video that appeared to show NFL player Ray Rice assaulting his fiancée. In January 2016, he was appointed as Settlement Master in the U.S. consumer litigation over the Volkswagen emissions scandal; as of May 11, 2017, the scandal has resulted in $11.2billion in customer settlements.

On October 19, 2016, Mueller began an external review of "security, personnel, and management processes and practices" at government contractor Booz Allen Hamilton after Harold T. Martin III was indicted for massive data theft from the National Security Agency. On April 6, 2017, he was appointed as Special Master for disbursement of $850million and $125million for automakers and consumers, respectively, affected by rupture-prone Takata airbags.

Mueller received the 2016 Thayer Award for public service from the United States Military Academy. In June 2017, he received the Baker Award for intelligence and national security contributions from the nonprofit Intelligence and National Security Alliance.

In October 2019, it was announced that Mueller, along with James L. Quarles and Aaron Zebley, would return to WilmerHale to resume private practice. On July 11, 2020, Mueller wrote an op-ed on The Washington Post stating that Roger Stone “remains a convicted felon, and rightly so” after the President of the United States granted Roger Stone clemency and defended his investigation.

Special Counsel for the Department of Justice 

On May 16, 2017, Mueller met with President Trump as a courtesy to provide perspectives on the FBI and input on considerations for hiring a new FBI Director. This meeting was initially widely reported to have been an interview to serve again as the FBI Director. President Trump broached resuming the position in their meeting; however, Mueller was ineligible to return as FBI Director due to statutory term limits, and Mueller lacked interest in resuming the position.

The next day, Deputy Attorney General Rod Rosenstein appointed Mueller to serve as special counsel for the United States Department of Justice. In this capacity, Mueller oversaw the investigation into "any links and/or coordination between the Russian government and individuals associated with the campaign of President Donald Trump, and any matters that arose or may arise directly from the investigation".

Mueller's appointment to oversee the investigation immediately garnered widespread support from both Democrats and Republicans in Congress. Newt Gingrich, former Republican Speaker of the House of Representatives and prominent conservative political commentator, stated via Twitter that "Robert Mueller is a superb choice to be special counsel. His reputation is impeccable for honesty and integrity." Senator Charles Schumer (D-NY) said, "Former Director Mueller is exactly the right kind of individual for this job. I now have significantly greater confidence that the investigation will follow the facts wherever they lead." Senator Rob Portman (R-OH) stated, "former FBI dir. Mueller is well qualified to oversee this probe". Some, however, pointed out an alleged conflict of interest. "The federal code could not be clearer—Mueller is compromised by his apparent conflict of interest in being close with James Comey," Rep. Trent Franks (R-AZ), who first called for Mueller to step down over the summer, said in a statement to Fox News. "The appearance of a conflict is enough to put Mueller in violation of the code. … All of the revelations in recent weeks make the case stronger."

Upon his appointment as special counsel, Mueller and two colleagues (former FBI agent Aaron Zebley and former assistant special prosecutor on the Watergate Special Prosecution Force James L. Quarles III) resigned from WilmerHale. On May 23, 2017, the U.S. Department of Justice ethics experts announced they had declared Mueller ethically able to function as special counsel. The spokesperson for the special counsel, Peter Carr, told NBC News that Mueller has taken an active role in managing the inquiry. In an interview with the Associated Press, Rosenstein said he would recuse himself from supervision of Mueller if he were to become a subject in the investigation due to his role in the dismissal of James Comey.

On June 14, 2017, The Washington Post reported that Mueller's office is also investigating Trump personally for possible obstruction of justice, in reference to the Russian probe. The report was questioned by Trump's legal team attorney Jay Sekulow, who said on June 18 on NBC's Meet the Press, "The President is not and has not been under investigation for obstruction, period." Due to the central role of the Trump family in the campaign, the transition, and the White House, the President's son-in-law, Jared Kushner, was also reportedly under scrutiny by Mueller. Also in June, Trump allegedly ordered the firing of Robert Mueller, but backed down when then-White House Counsel Don McGahn threatened to quit.

During a discussion about national security at the Aspen security conference on July 21, 2017, former CIA director John Brennan reaffirmed his support for Mueller and called for members of Congress to resist if Trump fires Mueller. He also said it was "the obligation of some executive-branch officials to refuse to carry out some of these orders that, again, are inconsistent with what this country is all about". After Peter Strzok, an investigator for Mueller, was removed from the investigation for alleged partiality, Senator Mark Warner, the Ranking Member of the United States Senate Select Committee on Intelligence in a speech on December 20, 2017, before the Senate warned of a constitutional crisis if the President fired Mueller. On June 22, 2018, Warner hosted a fundraising party for 100 guests and was quoted there saying, "If you get me one more glass of wine, I'll tell you stuff only Bob Mueller and I know. If you think you've seen wild stuff so far, buckle up. It's going to be a wild couple of months."

On October 30, 2017, Mueller filed charges against former Trump campaign chairman Paul Manafort and campaign co-chairman Rick Gates. The 12 charges include conspiracy to launder money, violations of the 1938 Foreign Agents Registration Act (FARA) as being an unregistered agent of a foreign principal, false and misleading FARA statements, and conspiracy against the United States.

On December 1, 2017, Mueller reached a plea agreement with former national security adviser Michael Flynn, who pleaded guilty to giving false testimony to the FBI about his contacts with Russian ambassador Sergey Kislyak. As part of Flynn's negotiations, his son, Michael G. Flynn, was not expected to be charged, and Flynn was prepared to testify that high-level officials on Trump's team directed him to make contact with the Russians. On February 16, 2018, Mueller indicted 13 Russian individuals and 3 Russian companies for attempting to trick Americans into consuming Russian propaganda that targeted Democratic nominee Hillary Clinton and later President-elect Donald Trump.

On February 20, 2018, Mueller charged attorney Alex van der Zwaan with making false statements in the Russia probe.

On May 20, 2018, Trump criticized Mueller, tweeting "the World's most expensive Witch Hunt has found nothing on Russia & me so now they are looking at the rest of the World!" Mueller started investigating the August 2016 meeting between Donald Trump Jr. and an emissary for the crown princes of Saudi Arabia and the United Arab Emirates. The emissary offered help to the Trump presidential campaign. Mueller was also investigating the Trump campaign's possible ties to Turkey, Qatar, Israel, and China.

On December 18, 2018, The Washington Post published an article concerning a report prepared for the U.S. Senate which stated that Russian disinformation teams had targeted Mueller.

On March 22, 2019, Mueller concluded his investigation and submitted the special counsel's final report to Attorney General William Barr. A senior Department of Justice official said that the report did not recommend any new indictments. On March 24, Attorney General Barr submitted a summary of findings to the United States Congress. He stated in his letter, "The Special Counsel's investigation did not find that the Trump campaign or anyone associated with it conspired or coordinated with Russian in its efforts to influence the 2016 U.S. presidential election." Mueller's report also reportedly did not take a stance on whether or not Trump committed obstruction of justice; Barr quoted Mueller as saying "while this report does not conclude that the President committed a crime, it also does not exonerate him."

On April 18, 2019, the Department of Justice released Report on the Investigation into Russian Interference in the 2016 Presidential Election, the special counsel's final report and its conclusions.

On May 29, 2019, Mueller announced that he was retiring as special counsel and that the office would be shut down, and he spoke publicly about the report for the first time. Saying "The report is my testimony," he indicated he would have nothing to say that was not already in the report. On the subject of obstruction of justice, he said, "under long-standing Department [of Justice] policy, a president cannot be charged with a crime while he is in office." He repeated his official conclusion that the report neither accused nor exonerated the president while adding that any potential wrongdoing by a president must be addressed by a "process other than the criminal justice system." Mueller reasserted the involvement of Russian operatives in the 2016 Democratic National Committee email leak and their parallel efforts to influence American public opinion using social media. Referring to those actions, he declared that "there were multiple, systematic efforts to interfere in our election. That allegation deserves the attention of every American."

Robert Mueller was initially scheduled to publicly testify before two House committees on July 17, 2019, with two hours for lawmakers to ask questions, but the hearing was postponed to July 24 with a third hour added for questions. His verbal testimony was expected to help inform the public—Democrats believe most Americans have not read the report—and to help Democratic leadership finally decide whether or not to impeach the President. In particular, the Democrats aimed to highlight what they consider to be the worst examples of Trump's conduct. Representative Jamie Raskin from Maryland said he would use visual aids, such as posters, to help people understand the implications of the Mueller report. Republicans, on the other hand, planned to question Mueller on the origins of this investigation.

On July 24, 2019, Mueller attended both congressional committee hearings and was questioned by members of Congress. His testimony followed the guidelines he had stated would be appropriate regarding his report. In fact, many of his responses were one-word replies. He said he was "not familiar" with Fusion GPS, the opposition research firm that commissioned the Steele dossier. He rejected claims that his investigation was a "witch hunt" or that it totally exonerated the President. He declined to answer questions outside of the scope of his investigation, but reiterated his concern about foreign interference with American elections. He noted that it continues, that he expects it to expand to include other foreign governments as well as the Russians, and that he considers it a great threat to the United States. According to the Nielsen Company, total viewership for the Mueller hearing fell just shy of 13million, significantly lower than other hearings involving the Trump administration, such as Supreme Court nominee Brett Kavanaugh's (20.4million), former FBI director James Comey's (19.5million), and former Trump attorney Michael Cohen's (15.8million). Reasons for this comparatively low television rating include the fact that the hearing occurred in July, vacation time for many Americans, and months after the release of the Mueller report. Fox News Channel enjoyed the top rating, with 3.03million views. Subsequently, Mueller's words were distorted and misinterpreted to both defend and condemn the President. Mueller's testimony was criticized by some as uncharacteristically confusing.

In late September 2019, it was reported Trump may have lied to Mueller about his knowledge of his campaign's contacts with WikiLeaks, citing the grand jury redactions in the Mueller report.

Political scientists William G. Howell and Terry M. Moe described Mueller's decision not to take a position on obstruction of justice for Trump—despite "compiling a mountain of incriminating evidence"—as something that "will surely go down as one of the strangest—and most consequential—moves in modern legal history." They added, "in refusing to draw legal conclusions from his evidence, Mueller simply didn't do his job... because he didn't, he failed to carry out his duty to tell the American people what his investigation actually revealed about Trump's lawless behavior, and he failed to draw a bright line that would keep future presidents within legal bounds."

The University of Virginia Law School announced in June 2021 that in the coming fall Mueller would participate in a six-session course called "The Mueller Report and the Role of the Special Counsel," along with three of his colleagues from the investigation.

Personal life 
Mueller met his future wife, Ann Cabell Standish, at a high school party when they were 17. Standish attended Miss Porter's School in Farmington, Connecticut, and Sarah Lawrence College, before working as a special-education teacher for children with learning disabilities. In September 1966, they married at St. Stephen's Episcopal Church in Sewickley, Pennsylvania. They have two daughters and three grandchildren. One of their daughters was born with spina bifida.

In 2001, Mueller's Senate confirmation hearings to head the FBI were delayed several months while he underwent treatment for prostate cancer. He was diagnosed in the fall of 2000, postponing being sworn in as FBI director until he received a good prognosis from his physician.

Although raised Presbyterian, he became an Episcopalian later in life.

Mueller and William Barr—the attorney general who supervised the late stage of Mueller's special counsel investigation—have known each other since the 1980s and have been described as good friends. Mueller attended the weddings of two of Barr's daughters, and their wives attend Bible study together.

Military awards
Mueller received the following military awards and decorations:

References

Further reading

External links 

 Profile at the Federal Bureau of Investigation and staff
 
 
 
 
 
 
 

1944 births
20th-century American lawyers
21st-century American lawyers
American Episcopalians
American people of English descent
American people of German descent
American people of Scottish descent
Assistant United States Attorneys
Directors of the Federal Bureau of Investigation
Identity theft victims
Lawyers from New York City
Living people
Members of the 2017 Special Counsel investigation team
Military personnel from New York City
New York (state) Republicans
New York University alumni
People from Manhattan
People from Philadelphia
Princeton University alumni
Recipients of the Gallantry Cross (Vietnam)
Special prosecutors
St. Paul's School (New Hampshire) alumni
United States Assistant Attorneys General for the Criminal Division
United States Attorneys for the Northern District of California
United States Marine Corps officers
United States Marine Corps personnel of the Vietnam War
University of Virginia School of Law alumni
Wilmer Cutler Pickering Hale and Dorr partners